Roslyn is a station on the East Busway, located in Swissvale.

References

Port Authority of Allegheny County stations
Martin Luther King Jr. East Busway